The European Union (EU) has expanded a number of times throughout its history by way of the accession of new member states to the Union. To join the EU, a state needs to fulfil economic and political conditions called the Copenhagen criteria (after the Copenhagen summit in June 1993), which require a stable democratic government that respects the rule of law, and its corresponding freedoms and institutions. According to the Maastricht Treaty, each current member state and the European Parliament must agree to any enlargement. The process of enlargement is sometimes referred to as European integration. This term is also used to refer to the intensification of co-operation between EU member states as national governments allow for the gradual harmonisation of national laws.

The EU's predecessor, the European Economic Community, was founded with the Inner Six member states in 1958, when the Treaty of Rome came into force. Since then, the EU's membership has grown to twenty-seven, with the latest member state being Croatia, which joined in July 2013. The most recent territorial enlargement of the EU was the incorporation of Mayotte in 2014. Campione d'Italia joined the EU Customs Union in 2020. The most notable territorial reductions of the EU, and its predecessors, have been the exit of Algeria upon independence in 1962, the exit of Greenland in 1985, and the withdrawal of the United Kingdom in 2020.

, accession negotiations are under way with Albania (since 2020), Montenegro (since 2012), North Macedonia (since 2020), Serbia (since 2014) and Turkey (since 2005). Serbia and Montenegro have been described by former President of the European Commission Jean-Claude Juncker and Enlargement commissioner Johannes Hahn as the frontrunner candidates, and projected that they would join by 2025, during the next mandate of the European Commission. Negotiations with Turkey are ongoing, but have effectively paused due to objections from the EU to the Turkish government's response to the 2016 coup d'état attempt, and democratic backsliding.

Bosnia and Herzegovina submitted an application for membership in 2016, as did Ukraine, Georgia, and Moldova in the first few weeks of the 2022 Russian invasion of Ukraine. In June 2022, Ukraine and Moldova were recognised as official candidates while Bosnia and Herzegovina and Georgia were recognised as potential candidates and were asked to complete additional reforms before becoming official candidates for membership. In December 2022, Bosnia and Herzegovina received official candidate status while Kosovo submitted a membership application.

Criteria 

According to the EU treaties, membership of the European Union is open to "any European State which respects the values referred to in Article 2 and is committed to promoting them" (TEU Article 49). Those Article 2 values are "respect for human dignity, freedom, democracy, equality, the rule of law and respect for human rights, including the rights of persons belonging to minorities." This is based on the 1993 "Copenhagen criteria" agreed as it became clear many former Eastern Bloc countries would apply to join:

In December 1995, the Madrid European Council revised the membership criteria to include conditions for member country integration through the appropriate adjustment of its administrative structures: since it is important that European Community legislation be reflected in national legislation, it is critical that the revised national legislation be implemented effectively through appropriate administrative and judicial structures.

Finally, and technically outside the Copenhagen criteria, comes the further requirement that all prospective members must enact legislation to bring their laws into line with the body of European law built up over the history of the Union, known as the acquis communautaire.

Process 

Today the accession process follows a series of formal steps, from a pre-accession agreement to the ratification of the final accession treaty. These steps are primarily presided over by the European Commission (Enlargement Commissioner and DG Enlargement), but the actual negotiations are technically conducted between the Union's Member States and the candidate country.

Before a country applies for membership it typically signs an association agreement to help prepare the country for candidacy and eventual membership. Most countries do not meet the criteria to even begin negotiations before they apply, so they need many years to prepare for the process. An association agreement helps prepare for this first step.

In the case of the Western Balkans, a special process, the Stabilisation and Association Process exists to deal with the special circumstances there.

When a country formally applies for membership, the Council asks the commission to prepare an opinion on the country's readiness to begin negotiations. The council can then either accept or reject the commission's opinion (The council has only once rejected the commission's opinion when the latter advised against opening negotiations with Greece).

If the Council agrees to open negotiations the screening process then begins. The commission and candidate country examine its laws and those of the EU and determine what differences exist. The Council then recommends opening negotiations on "chapters" of law that it feels there is sufficient common ground to have constructive negotiations. Negotiations are typically a matter of the candidate country convincing the EU that its laws and administrative capacity are sufficient to execute European law, which can be implemented as seen fit by the member states. Often this will involve time-lines before the Acquis Communautaire (European regulations, directives and standards) has to be fully implemented.

A chapter is said to be closed when both sides have agreed it has been implemented sufficiently, however it can still be re-opened if the Commission feels that the candidate has fallen out of compliance.

To assess progress achieved by countries in preparing for accession to the European Union, the European Commission submits regular reports (yearly) to the European Council. These serve as a basis for the council to make decisions on negotiations or their extension to other candidates.

Once the negotiations are complete, a Treaty of Accession will be signed, which must then be ratified by all of the member states of the Union, as well as the institutions of the Union, and the candidate country. Once this has been completed it will join the Union on the date specified in the treaty.

The entire process, from application for membership to membership has typically taken about a decade, although some countries, notably Sweden, Finland, and Austria have been faster, taking only a few years. The process from application for association agreement through accession has taken far longer, as much as several decades (Turkey, for example, first applied for association in the 1950s and has yet to conclude accession negotiations).

On 18 October 2019, France vetoed starting of negotiations with Albania and North Macedonia, citing problems with the current enlargement process. In November 2019, France proposed a seven-stage accession plan for membership. The reformed accession strategy proposes participation in different programs, such as Erasmus, Banking Union, Capital Markets Union, Customs Union, etc.

Example 
The following is an example of the accession process—Estonia's path to membership from its restoration of independence from the Soviet Union in November 1991 with recognition from the EU the same month to membership in May 2004. Ease of accession depends on the state: how integrated it is with the EU beforehand, the state of its economy and public institutions, any outstanding political issues with the EU and (historically) how much law to date the EU has built up that the acceding state must adopt. This outline also includes integration steps taken by the accession country after it attains membership.

Success and fatigue 
Enlargement has been one of the EU's successful foreign policies, yet has equally suffered from considerable opposition from the start. French President Charles de Gaulle opposed British membership. A later French President, François Mitterrand, opposed Greek, Spanish and Portuguese membership, fearing that the former dictatorships were not ready and that the countries' inclusion would reduce the union to a free-trade area.

The reasons for the first member states to apply, and for them to be accepted, were primarily economic while the second enlargement was more political. The southern Mediterranean countries had just emerged from dictatorships and wanted to secure their democratic systems through the EEC, while the EEC wanted to ensure the same thing and that their southern neighbours were stable and aligned to NATO. These two principal forces, economic gain and political security, have been behind enlargements since. After the large enlargements in 2004, public opinion in Europe turned against further expansion.

It has also been acknowledged that enlargement has its limits; the EU cannot expand endlessly. Former Commission President Romano Prodi favoured granting "everything but institutions" to the EU's neighbour states, allowing them to co-operate deeply while not adding strain on the EU's institutional framework. This has in particular been pushed by France and Germany as a privileged partnership for Turkey, membership for which has faced considerable opposition on cultural and logistical grounds.

Historical enlargements

Founding members 
The European Coal and Steel Community (ECSC) was proposed by Robert Schuman in his declaration on 9 May 1950 and involved the pooling of the coal and steel industries of France and West Germany. Half of the project states, Belgium, Luxembourg, and the Netherlands, had already achieved a great degree of integration amongst themselves with the organs of Benelux and earlier bilateral agreements. These five countries were joined by Italy and they all signed the Treaty of Paris on 23 July 1952. These six members, dubbed the 'Inner Six' (as opposed to the 'outer seven' who formed the European Free Trade Association who were suspicious of such plans for integration) went on to sign the Treaties of Rome establishing two further communities, together known as the European Communities when they merged their executives in 1967.

In 1962, Spain, ruled by the military dictator Francisco Franco, issued its first attempt to join the European Communities. Spanish Foreign Affairs minister Fernando María Castiella sent the request form to French Prime Minister Maurice Couve de Murville. This request was rejected by all the member countries in 1964; Spain was not a democracy at the time, and thus unable to enter the EEC.

The Community did see some loss of territory due to the decolonialisation occurring in their era. Algeria, which was an integral part of France, had a special relationship with the Community. Algeria gained independence on 5 July 1962 and hence left the Community. There would be no further efforts at enlargement until the early 1970s.

First enlargement 

The United Kingdom, which had refused to join as a founding member, changed its policy following the Suez crisis and applied to be a member of the Communities. Other EEC members were also inclined to British membership on those grounds. French President Charles de Gaulle vetoed British membership.

Once de Gaulle had left office, the door to enlargement was once again opened. The EEC economy had also slowed down and British membership was seen as a way to revitalise the community. Only after a 12-hour talk between British Prime Minister Edward Heath and French President Georges Pompidou took place did Britain's third application succeed. After Britain was accepted Prime Minister Edward Heath said:
"For my part, I have no doubt at all that the discussions which we have had will prove of real and lasting benefit, not only to Britain and France, but to Europe as a whole."

As part of the deal for British entry, France agreed to allow the EEC its own monetary resources. However France made that concession only as Britain's small agriculture sector would ensure that Britain would be a net contributor to the Common Agricultural Policy dominated EEC budget. Applying together with the UK, as on the previous occasions, were Denmark, Ireland, and Norway. These countries were so economically linked to the UK that they considered it necessary to join the EEC if the UK did. However the Norwegian government lost a national referendum on membership and hence did not accede with the others on 1 January 1973. Gibraltar joined the Community with the United Kingdom at this point, as can be seen in the long title of the UK European Communities Act 1972.

Mediterranean enlargements 

The next enlargement would occur for different reasons. The 1970s also saw Greece, Spain, and Portugal emerge from dictatorship. These countries desired to consolidate their new democratic systems by binding themselves into the EEC. Equally, the EEC was unsure about which way these countries were heading and wanted to ensure stability along its southern borders. However François Mitterrand initially opposed their membership fearing they were not ready and it would water the community down to a free trade area.

Greece joined the EU in 1981 followed by Spain and Portugal in 1986.

The year 1985, however, saw the first time a territory voted to leave the Community, when Greenland was granted home rule by Denmark and the territory used its new powers and voted to withdraw from the Community (see member state territories).

Morocco and Turkey applied for membership in 1987. Morocco's application was turned down as it was not considered European, while Turkey's application was considered eligible on the basis of the 1963 Ankara Association Agreement, but the opinion of the commission on the possible candidate status was by then negative. Turkey received candidate status only in 1999 and began official membership negotiations in 2005, which were still in progress as of 2021.

Post–Cold War 

After the 1970s, Europe experienced an economic downturn which led to leaders launching of the Single European Act which set to create a single market by 1992. The effect of this was that EFTA states found it harder to export to the EEC and businesses (including large EFTA corporations such as Volvo) wished to relocate within the new single market making the downturn worse for EFTA. EFTA states began to discuss closer links with the EEC despite its domestic unpopularity.

Austria, Finland, and Sweden were neutral in the Cold War so membership of an organisation developing a common foreign and security policy would be incompatible with that. With the end of the Cold War in 1989, that obstacle was removed, and the desire to pursue membership grew stronger. On 3 October 1990, the reunification of East and West Germany brought East Germany into the Community without increasing the number of member states.

The Community later became the European Union in 1993 by virtue of the Maastricht Treaty, and established standards for new entrants so their suitability could be judged. The Copenhagen criteria stated in 1993 that a country must be a democracy, operate a free market, and be willing to adopt the entire body of EU law already agreed upon. Also in 1993 the European Economic Area was established with the EFTA states except Switzerland. Most of the new EEA states pursued full EU membership as the EEA did not sufficiently satisfy the needs of their export based corporations. The EU has also preferred these states to integrate via the EEA rather than full membership as the EEC wished to pursue monetary integration and did not wish for another round of enlargement to occupy their attention. However, with the EEA's credibility dented following rejection by businesses and Switzerland, the EU agreed with full membership. This was more readily accepted with the prospect of poorer countries wishing to join; contributions from richer countries would help balance the EU budget. On 1 January 1995 Austria, Finland, and Sweden acceded to the EU marking its fourth enlargement. The Norwegian government lost a second national referendum on membership.

Eastern enlargement 

In the late 1980's (shortly prior to the dissolution of the Soviet Union) Mikhail Gorbachev announced the Soviet Union would no longer intervene in other countries' internal affairs (Sinatra Doctrine), practically freeing Central and Eastern Europe from Soviet occupation (Czechoslovakia and Hungary) / Soviet backed authoritarian regimes. These countries wanted to consolidate their democracies through joining Western world international organisations (including participation in European integration) which would ensure the newly emerged democracies would not fall back under Russian control. The EU and NATO offered a guarantee of this, and the EU was also seen as vital to ensuring the economic success of those countries. However, the EU's desire to accept these countries' membership applications was less than rapid. The collapse of communism came quickly and was not anticipated. The EU struggled to deal with the sudden reunification of Germany with the addition of its poorer 17 million people and, while keeping its monetary union project on track, it was still at that early stage pointing the EFTA countries in the direction of the EEA rather than full membership.

States in Central and Eastern Europe persisted and eventually the above-mentioned issues were cleared. The US also pressured the EU to offer membership as a temporary guarantee; it feared expanding NATO too rapidly for fear of frightening Russia. Although eventually trying to limit the number of members, and after encouragement from the US, the EU pursued talks with ten countries and a change of mind by Cyprus and Malta helped to offset slightly the influx of large poorer member states from Central and Eastern Europe.

In the end, eight Central and Eastern European countries (the Czech Republic, Estonia, Hungary, Latvia, Lithuania, Poland, Slovakia, and Slovenia), plus two Mediterranean countries (Malta and Cyprus) joined on 1 May 2004. This was the largest single enlargement in terms of people, and number of countries, though not in terms of GDP. The less developed nature of these countries was of concern to some of the older member states. Some countries, such as the UK, immediately opened their job market to the accession states, whereas most others placed temporary restrictions on the rights of work of the citizens of these states to their countries. The movement westward of some of the labour force of the newly acceded countries that occurred in the aftermath of the enlargement initially spawned clichés among the public opinion and media of some western countries (such as the "Polish plumber"), despite the generally conceded benefit to the economies concerned. The official EU media (the speeches of the European Commission) frequently referred to the enlargement to the CEE region as "an historical opportunity" and "morally imperative", which reflected the desire of the EU to admit these countries as members, even though they were less developed than the Western European countries.

Following this, Romania and Bulgaria (deemed initially as not fully ready by the commission to join in 2004) acceded nevertheless on 1 January 2007. These, like the countries joining in 2004, faced a series of restrictions as to their citizens not fully enjoying working rights on the territory of some of the older EU members. As of mid-2022, Bulgaria and Romania are not members of the Schengen Area nor the Eurozone; however, their citizens can travel visa-free to the other EU countries.

The socio-economic research on the attitudes towards the integration from both hosting and visiting countries has revealed divergent views. The analysis shows, there are a number of possible factors of the rationalisation and understanding of the practices on what the enlargement has been and should be like. Attitudes of even sceptical citizens, do not discard the possibility on future sustainable enlargements. The years subsequent to the EU accession will lead to extensive dialogues between policy-makers, governments, and European citizens about the path for a constructive development.

Western Balkans enlargements 

The 2003 European Council summit in Thessaloniki set integration of the Western Balkans as a priority of EU expansion. The EU's relations with the Western Balkans states were moved from the "External Relations" to the "Enlargement" policy segment in 2005. Those states which have not been recognised as candidate countries are considered "potential candidate countries". The move to Enlargement directorate was a consequence of the advancement of the Stabilisation and Association process.

Croatia joined on 1 July 2013, following ratification of the 2011 Accession Treaty by all other EU countries. Albania and the several successor states of the Socialist Federal Republic of Yugoslavia have all adopted EU integration as an aim of foreign policy.

Detail

Timeline

Potential enlargements

Current enlargement agenda 

Article 49 of the Maastricht Treaty (as amended) says that any European state that respects the "principles of liberty, democracy, respect for human rights and fundamental freedoms, and the rule of law", may apply to join the Union. The European Council set out the conditions for EU membership in June 1993 in the so-called Copenhagen criteria (see Criteria above for details). The Western Balkan states had to sign Stabilisation and Association Agreements (SAAs) before applying for membership.

Albania, Bosnia and Herzegovina, Moldova, Montenegro, North Macedonia, Serbia and Ukraine are all recognised as official candidates and in negotiation; negotiations with candidate Turkey are effectively frozen. Georgia and Kosovo have submitted EU membership applications and are recognised as potential candidates for membership by the EU.

Turkey applied for membership in 1987. The Western Balkans have been prioritised for membership since emerging from war during the break-up of Yugoslavia in the early 1990s.

In July 2014, President of the European Commission Jean-Claude Juncker announced that the EU has no plans to expand in the next five years. Juncker has described Serbia and Montenegro as front-runner candidates, and projected that they would join by 2025. The European Council endorsed starting negotiations with North Macedonia and Albania on 26 March 2020, and they could join after 2025. Turkey is not expected to join anytime soon.

On 6 February 2018, the European Commission published its expansion plan, which covers the six Western Balkan countries. The plan envisages that all six applicants could achieve accession as members of the European Union after 2025. In May 2018, Bulgaria—holding the rotating presidency of the Council of the European Union—hosted a summit on the Western Balkans, which aimed to facilitate accession by the six, including enhanced regional security cooperation and regional connectivity.

It was noteworthy that the Summit referred to 'partners' rather than states: this reflects that Kosovo is partially recognised as a state. As of 2018, Kosovo was not recognised by fellow Western Balkan applicant Serbia, and existing EU members Spain, Slovakia, Cyprus, Romania, and Greece. The European Commission is sensitive to the issue which was addressed in a speech by the EU's High Representative/Vice-President Federica Mogherini at the European Parliament Plenary Session on the Western Balkan Strategy: "shared, unequivocal, concrete perspective for European Union integration for each and every one of the six partners. Each at its own pace, with its own specificities and under different conditions, but the direction is clear and is one."

Amid the 2022 Russian invasion of Ukraine, the three former Soviet republics of Ukraine, Moldova and Georgia submitted applications for EU membership.
The European Parliament subsequently voted to accept an emergency petition from the government of Ukraine for EU member state candidacy. On 17 June 2022, the European Commission recommended that Ukraine and Moldova become candidates for EU membership, and that Georgia be recognised as a potential candidate but that it would need to "meet certain conditions" to be granted candidate status. These conditions included investing more in education and infrastructure, and completing a number of reforms in the areas of elections, judicial independence, crime, corruption, and oligarchs. These recommendations were approved by the European Council during a summit on 23 June. 

Kosovo submitted its application for membership on 14 December 2022 and on the 15th, the Commission granted candidate status to Bosnia and Herzegovina.

Abandoned enlargement negotiations 

Several sovereign states have previously submitted applications for membership to the EU, but are no longer on the agenda:

 Norway has completed membership negotiations twice, in 1972 and 1994, but both times membership was rejected in a referendum. The application remains frozen.
 Switzerland applied for membership in 1992 but subsequently froze its application. It formally withdrew it in 2016.
 Iceland applied in 2009 following an economic collapse, but froze accession negotiations in 2013 after the election of a new government.

See also 

 Eastern Partnership
 Enlargement of the African Union
 Enlargement of the eurozone
 Enlargement of the United Nations
 Enlargement of NATO
 Euronest Parliamentary Assembly
 European integration
 Foreign relations of the European Union
 Potential enlargement of the European Union
 Treaty of Accession 2003
 Treaty of Accession 2005
 Treaty of Accession 2011
 Union for the Mediterranean
 Withdrawal from the European Union
 European Free Trade Association
 European Economic Area
 Schengen Area

Notes and references

External links 

 Enlargement  – Europa
 EU enlargement documentation on EUR-Lex
 European Union Member States and applicant countries – CVCE
 Archival material concerning the enlargement of the European Union can be consulted at the Historical Archives of the European Union in Florence

 
Enlargement of intergovernmental organizations